Tokyo 7th Sisters (Tokyo 7th シスターズ) is a Japanese idol raising simulation and rhythm game released for iOS and Android in February 2014, developed and published by Donuts Co. Ltd. with music produced and published under record label Victor Entertainment. The game has a story mode (called Scout in-game) in which players search for idol cards while progressing through the story and a battle mode in which players battle other players or certain in-game characters using their idol cards.

A 77-minute anime film adaptation by LandQ studios titled Tokyo 7th Sisters: Bokura wa Aozora ni Naru was scheduled to air in Summer 2020, but has been delayed to February 26, 2021 due to the COVID-19 pandemic.

The story centers on "new generation" idols from the studio "777 (Three Seven)", referred to as Nanastar, in the year 2034, in a future where idols are considered a thing of the past. The player acts as the manager of Nanastar, whose job is to recruit and train a number of different girls by collecting and leveling collectible cards. The cast of characters includes more than 50 fully-voiced, unique idols from different backgrounds.

Story
In the year of 2032, the legendary idol unit "7th Sisters" suddenly retired from the industry and disappeared. That was the end of the idol industry... Until two years later, when a young glory-seeking employee (the player) is appointed to be the leader of Tokyo's next generation idol studio, "777 (Three Seven)", commonly referred to as Nanastar. However, the city continues to believe that idols are a thing of the past, and Nanastar is no exception. The story of the idols of the future, the Nanastar Sisters, will now unfold.

Characters

Nanastar Managers 

 Coney Rokusaki (六咲コニー, Rokusaki Konī)
 Voiced by: Inori Minase (Japanese)
 A 19 year-old girl who suddenly introduces herself as the "Talent reganaM" from the first generation of idols. She is the co-manager of Nanastar alongside the player. She is ridiculously high-spirited, but is also very considerate and acts as a good counselor for the recruited girls. She is a big troublemaker, and seems to be hiding a secret...

 Manager (Player Character) (支配人, Shihainin)
 The player character. You have been chosen as the second manager of Nanastar. Your overly enthusiastic new manager, Rokusaki Coney, sends you out to the city to scout for idols. Your player name is customizable in-game.

 The First Manager
 Voiced by: Keiji Fujiwara (Japanese) 
 The player character's predecessor, and the one in charge of 7th Sisters prior to their disbandment.

Seventh Sisters 

 Nicole Nanasaki (七咲ニコル, Nanasaki Nikoru)
 Voiced by: Inori Minase (Japanese)
 A relentless idol terrorist, the chaotic leader of the legendary Seventh Sisters. At times she was kind, at other times was lazy, and for some strange reason. She worked hard, attracting attention from all over the world. Two years after the sudden dissolution, no one has any news of her.

 Mito Hanyuda (羽生田ミト,Hanyuda Mito)
 Voiced by: Mai Fuchigami
 Also Known as the "Unsmiling Ice Diva" , A member of the Seventh Sisters. She had a world-class beautiful voice. Because she doesn't want to waste her energy when singing, she usually stays expressionless. It seems that Nicole has been a childhood friend since kindergarten. Her favorite food is tofu.

 Mana Misonoo (御園尾マナ, Misonoō Mana)
 Voiced by: Rena Maeda
 One of the world's leading conglomerates "Misono Konze" Lun's only daughter and a gentle mood maker who supports the Sisters from behind the scenes. Although she is shy about her dynamite body, she sometimes shows a dignified adult side that surprises the members.

 Qruit Kotobuki (寿クルト, Kotobuki Kuruto)
 Voiced by: Yuuko Kurose
 An Astonishing physical ability, dark-skinned Wild Child Seventh Trickster. Apparently an orphan, she grew up in a circus. Anyway, she's always hungry and often bites the head of the members of the Seventh Sisters and gets scolded.

 Rui Wakaoji (若王子ルイ, Wakaōji Rui)
 Voiced by: Meiko Kawasaki
 Clean, dignified, and beautiful. The twinkling Prince of the Sisters, who is the No. 1 favorite among guardians, with her invincible demeanor. She is the oldest member and has the most common sense. Possessing a terrifying ability to handle troubles, she single-handedly handles the many unusual incidents caused by the members.
 Memoru Yusa (遊佐メモル, Yusa Memoru)
 Voiced by: Ayumi Tsuji
 Sisters core fan popular Butch Gilly number 1 girl. But her true identity is… the most evil two-faced girl who loves tricks and making money. In front of her fans, she sticks to her lovely lolita Memorun and captivates fans with a mysterious juice called Memorun juice (poison).

777☆SISTERS 

 Haru Kasukabe (春日部ハル, Kasukabe Haru)
 Voiced by: Minami Shinoda (Japanese)
 The first idol to be recruited into Nanastar. An energetic 16 year-old girl who loves to sing, Haru debuted as an idol prior to the events of the story, but was never able to succeed, hating idols as a result. After joining Nanastar, she acts as the mediator for everyone. Her interests are cleaning and collecting keychains.

 Musubi Tendouji (天堂寺ムスビ, Tendōji Musubi)
 Voiced by: Yūki Takada (Japanese)
 The second idol to be recruited into Nanastar. A first-year high school student and part of the student council, Musubi is a seemingly-perfect 16 year-old girl who is both beautiful and excellent in school. In reality, she worries easily and believes she has many weaknesses. She is talented at playing Tetris and loves yakisoba.

 Rona Tsunomori (角森ロナ, Tsunomori Rona)
 Voiced by: Ai Kakuma (Japanese)
 The third idol to be recruited into Nanastar. A 16 year-old girl who works part-time at the doughnut chain Viva Donuts, Rona is very shy and worries a lot. She thought very poorly of herself until she discovered 7th Sisters' music, which encouraged her to become an idol herself despite being hesitant at first due to her shy personality. She is a big fan of 7th Sisters member Nicole Nanasaki, and is talented at beanbag juggling.

 Hime Nonohara (野ノ原ヒメ, Nonohara Hime)
 Voiced by: Yui Nakajima (Japanese) 
 The fourth idol to be recruited into Nanastar. The daughter of the family owned "Nonohara Tofu Shop", Hime is a tomboyish 16 year-old girl whose mother died when she was young. She lives with her father, younger sister, and younger brother, and helps take care of her siblings and manage the tofu shop. Despite her appearance, she does not find herself cute. She is talented at delivering food.

 Momoka Serizawa (芹沢モモカ, Serizawa Momoka)
 Voiced by: Shiori Izawa (Japanese)
 The fifth idol to be recruited into Nanastar. A 15 year-old first year high school student, Momoka was spoiled as a child, which made her lazy and selfish. Her favorite phrase is, "Ehh...", indicating her lack of interest in the topic at hand. Despite this, she is a very passionate otaku. She is a self-proclaimed "Chubux taste sommelier". In the game's main story EPISODE 5.0, set 9 years into the future in the year 2043, Momoka is 24 years old. She follows in Coney's footsteps, assuming the role of the new manager.

 Sumire Usuta (臼田スミレ, Usuta Sumire)
 Voiced by: Ayaka Shimizu (Japanese)
 The sixth idol to be recruited into Nanastar. Sumire is a 17 year-old girl who grew up in an ordinary family, which makes her style seem overly glamorous. She is a very gentle girl, despite her looks and tone of voice, and is very fashionable. She is talented at cooking, and has a crush on the player character.

 Sui Kamishiro (神城スイ, Kamishiro Sui)
 Voiced by: Haruka Michii (Japanese)
 The seventh idol to be recruited into Nanastar. Sui appears to be just a regular tomboy, but in reality, she is a talented swimmer who claims to be dangerously allergic to boys; when one touches her, she is known to lunge at them in response. She is the star of the swim team, and is best at the 400 meter Individual Medley. Despite her appearance, she can be quite girly.

 Shizuka Kuonji (久遠寺シズカ, Kuonji Shizuka)
 Voiced by: Asaka Imai (Japanese)
 The eighth idol to be recruited into Nanastar. Shizuka is the youngest daughter of the Kuonji family, which owns a large estate. She is a talented girl who is talented in both literary and military arts, however she knows nothing about the real world. She loves puns and humorous things, and is good friends with 7th Sisters member Mana Misonoo. She is talented in archery and traditional tea ceremonies.

 Alessandra Susu (アレサンドラ・スース)
 Voiced by: Saori Ōnishi (Japanese)
 The ninth idol to be recruited into Nanastar. Susu is one of the 10 foreign idols in the game; she is very good at Japanese, but likes to occasionally use English. She is a 14 year-old girl who likes to act older than she is and has the style of a model, which gets her mistaken as a foreign celebrity. She tends to cry at night due to being homesick, but she is described by the other Nanastar members as a very strong and wise young woman. Susu is talented at ballet, and likes collecting perfume.

 Sawara Harumi (晴海サワラ, Harumi Sawara)
 Voiced by: Sakura Nakamura (Japanese)
 The tenth idol to be recruited into Nanastar. The 19 year-old eldest daughter of the Harumi family, Sawara helps with the family-run fish market Uoharu with her sisters. People around her find her very attractive until she opens her mouth. Beyond her looks, she is very lazy and strange, and pays no mind to others' gossip about her personality. Deep down, Sawara can be very trustworthy, and she loves her sisters more than anything. She likes mountain-climbing, cameras, and is currently a university student.

 Kajika Harumi (晴海カジカ, Harumi Kajika)
 Voiced by: Maika Takai (Japanese)
 The eleventh idol to be recruited into Nanastar. The 14 year-old second daughter of the Harumi family, Kajika helps with the family-run fish market Uoharu with her sisters. Kajika thinks of herself as energetic, helpful, and polite, but she can often be quite careless. She loves sweet things, and despite being the daughter of a fish-dealer, she does not like raw fish and is sad that she cannot enjoy sashimi. She is talented at making sweets, and is a member of the choir club.

 Shinju Harumi (晴海シンジュ, Harumi Shinju)
 Voiced by: Yūki Kuwahara (Japanese)
 The twelfth and final idol of 777☆SISTERS to be recruited into Nanastar. The 10 year-old youngest daughter of the Harumi family, Shinju helps with the family-run fish market Uoharu with her sisters. Despite her appearance, she is incredibly mature and realistic for her age. She becomes overly-conscious of herself when she acts childishly, and often chastises her sisters for their behavior. She is talented at accounting, and likes collecting frog charms.

CASQUETTE’S 

 Sisala Kawasumi (川澄シサラ, Kawasumi Shisarā)
 Voiced by: Rie Suegara (Japanese)
 An 18-year-old beautiful girl who was selected as "Tokyo 7th Cinderella Girl 2033" out of a super fierce battle with a total of 200,000 entries. At present, it is said that she is the closest to being the successor to the Seventh  Sisters, but she herself does not seem to have much interest in being an idol.

 Mimi Futagawa (ニ川ミミ, Futagawa Mimi)
 Voiced by: Aya Saito (Japanese)
 A 20-year-old girl who has the leeway of being an adult, which is rare in Nanastar. She has a lively personality that challenges things with a straight ball. She also has an active side, going out for a drive in her car on holidays (she got her license). My hobby is driving, and what I'm not good at is driving.

 Chacha Ootori (鳳チャチャ, Ōtori Chacha)
 Voiced by: Yō Taichi (Japanese)
 A purely Japanese-style young lady who says terrible things without hesitation (no offense to herself). She speaks like a samurai, probably because her family owns an old bookstore and he has been reading books since she was young.

 Miwako Azami (浅見ミワコ, Azami Miwako)
 Voiced by: Kana Yuki (Japanese)
 A 22-year-old who aims to become an English teacher, she works part-time as a private tutor. I love hard rock and glam rock, and that's why I want to become an English teacher (but don't tell my students).

Le☆S☆Ca 

 Kyoko "U” Uesugi (上杉・ウエバス・キョーコ, Uesugi Uēbasu Kyōko)
 Voiced by: Ayami Yoshi (2014 - 2019), Honoka Inoue (2019 - present) (Japanese)
 A girl who looks like a mixed-race child and looks far from Japanese. The person herself seems to be confident in her proportions, but she is shy when people look closely at her. She likes horror movies, but she’s afraid to watch them alone.

 Rena Araki (荒木レナ, Araki Rena)
 Voiced by: Akane Fujita (2014 - 2019), Mayu Izuka (2019 - present) (Japanese)

 Honoka Nishizono (西園ホノカ, Nishizono Honoka)
 Voiced by: Hikaru Ueda (Japanese)

Ci+LUS 

 Makoto Tamasaka (玉坂マコト, Tamasaka Makoto)
 Voiced by: Eri Yamazaki (Japanese)

 Ayumu Orikasa (折笠アユム, Orikasa Ayumu)
 Voiced by: Minami Tanaka (Japanese)

The QUEEN of Purple 

 Murasaki Echizen (越前ムラサキ, Echīzen Murasaki)
 Voiced by: Maiko Nomura (Japanese)

 Ferb Seto (瀬戸ファーブ, Seto Fābu)
 Voiced by: Yuki Hirose (Japanese)

 Yumeno Sakaiya (堺屋ユメノ, Sakaiya Yumeno)
 Voiced by: Ayano Yamamoto (Japanese)

 Matsuri Mimori (三森マツリ, Mimori Matsuri)
 Voiced by: Yuiko Tatsumi (Japanese)

Nanabana Otome 

 Tomoe Shiratori (白鳥トモエ, Shiratori Tomoe)
 Voiced by: Kumi Takaragi (Japanese)

 Madoka Enami (榎並マドカ, Enami Madoka)
 Voiced by: Ayumi Fuji (Japanese)

 Risyuri Maezono (前園リシュリ, Maezono Rīsyūri)
 Voiced by: Ru Thing (Japanese)

 Xiao Fei Hung (シャオ・ヘイフォン)
 Voiced by: Chisato Mori (Japanese)

 Miu Aihara (逢原ミウ, Aihara Miu)
 Voiced by: Marika Kōno (Japanese)

 Kumomaki Monaka (雲巻モナカ, Kumomaki Monaka)
 Voiced by: Amisa Sakuragi (Japanese)

 Sawori Yamai (夜舞サヲリ, Yamai Sawori)
 Voiced by: Eri Inagawa (Japanese)

Kodomo Rengo 

 Tasha Romanovsky (ターシャ.ロマノフスキー)
 Voiced by: Maria Takakishi (Japanese)

 Manon Hoshigaki (星柿マノン, Hoshigaki Manon)
 Voiced by: Yuri Yamaoka (Japanese)

 Shirayuki Arisu (有栖シラユキ, Arisu Shirayuki)
 Voiced by: Natsuki Kita (Japanese)

Others 

 Kazumi Katsuragi (桂木カヅミ, Katsuragi Kazumi)
 Voiced by: Rika Tachibana (Japanese)

 Jedah Diamond (ジェダ・ダイヤモンド)
 Voiced by: Anju Inami (Japanese)

 Ei Yukuhashi (逝橋エイ, Yukuhashi Ei)
 Voiced by: Mao Ichimichi (Japanese)

4U 

 Ume Kujyo (九条ウメ, Kujō Ume)
 Voiced by: Mami Yamashita (Japanese)

 Emoko Wanibuchi (鰐淵エモコ, Wanibuchi Emoko)
 Voiced by: Mayu Yoshioka (Japanese)

 Hina Saeki (佐伯ヒナ, Saeki Hina)
 Voiced by: Maria Naganawa (Japanese)

Karakuri 

 Futaba Karakuri (唐栗フタバ, Karakuri Futaba) and Hitoha Karakuri (唐栗ヒトハ, Karakuri Hitoha)
 Voiced by: Akina (Japanese)

AXIS 

 Nero Amagami (天神礻口, ''Amagami Nero’’)
 Voiced by: Inori Minase (Japanese)

Film

The film is directed by Takayuki Kitagawa, with Masakazu Sunagawa serving as assistant director, Yosuke Kikuchi designing the characters, and Yoshiaki Dewa composing the film's music. The film was originally scheduled to air in Summer 2020, but was delayed to Winter 2021 due to the COVID-19 pandemic. LandQ Studios animated the film, and Toei Animation produced it.

References

External links
 
Official animation website (in Japanese)
Official Tokyo 7th Sisters Twitter account (in Japanese)
Official page on Victor Entertainment's website (in Japanese)

2014 video games
Android (operating system) games
Free-to-play video games
IOS games
Japanese idol video games
Music video games
Video games developed in Japan